At the 1992 Summer Olympics in Barcelona, 14 events in rowing were contested, eight for men and six for women.

Medal table

Men's events

Women's events

See also
Rowers at the 1992 Summer Olympics

References

External links
Official Olympic Report, pp. 517–530

 
1992 Summer Olympics events
1992